An under-secretary-general of the United Nations (USG) is a senior official within the United Nations System, normally appointed by the General Assembly on the recommendation of the secretary-general for a renewable term of four years. Under-secretary-general is the third highest rank in the United Nations, after the secretary-general and the deputy secretary-general. The rank is held by the heads of different UN entities, certain high officials of the United Nations Secretariat, and high-level envoys. The United Nations regards the rank as equal to that of a cabinet minister of a member state, and under-secretaries-general have diplomatic immunity under the UN Charter.

Appointment and accountability
The majority of USGs are appointed by the General Assembly on the recommendation of the secretary-general for a fixed term of four years. Others (normally special envoys, Secretariat-appointees and non-programme management positions) are appointed directly by the UN secretary-general on his own authority. However, all USGs report to the General Assembly through the secretary-general. The only exception to this is the under-secretary-general for internal oversight services, who reports directly to the General Assembly.

The distinction in method of appointment is important as USGs appointed by the General Assembly have a mandate independent of the secretary-general, and he is therefore unable to remove them from office without the General Assembly's consent. This restriction has been seen by many commentators to weaken the secretary-general's ability to provide strong leadership and management within the United Nations System.

Equivalent rank
Some senior posts within the UN System have the equivalent rank of under-secretary-general but are either not entitled or choose not to use the formal title. The most prominent example of this is the administrator of the United Nations Development Programme, who is often referred to as the third most senior official within the UN System yet does not use the title of under-secretary-general. The UN high commissioner for human rights also has the rank of under-secretary-general, yet does not use the title.

Diplomatic rank
USGs have diplomatic rank equivalent to that of a national cabinet minister. Under Article 105 of the United Nations Charter they have diplomatic immunity.

Senior Management Group (SMG)
With over 50 people with the rank of under-secretary-general, unsurprisingly the influence and power they wield within the UN System varies dramatically. The most important USGs, controlling budgets, programmes or key activities, are also members of the United Nations Senior Management Group, whose objective is to ensure strategic coherence and direction in the work of the organization. The cabinet was approved by the General Assembly in 1997 as part of the reform proposal submitted by Secretary-General Kofi Annan.

List of under-secretaries-general
The following is a list of under-secretaries-general or those with equivalent rank. This list is not exhaustive. Members of the SMG are indicated by an asterisk (*).

Programmes and commissions
Volker Türk * – High Commissioner, United Nations Office of the High Commissioner for Human Rights (OHCHR)
Jens Wandel – Executive Director of United Nations Office for Project Services (UNOPS)
Ghada Waly * – Director-General, United Nations Office at Vienna and Chief Executive, United Nations Office on Drugs and Crime (UNODC)
Sima Sami Bahous* – Under-Secretary-General, executive director of the United Nations Entity for Gender Equality and the Empowerment of Women (UN Women)
Winnie Byanyima – Executive Director, Joint United Nations Programme on HIV/AIDS (UNAIDS)
Houlin Zhao – Secretary-General International Telecommunication Union
Chaesub Lee – Director ITU-T
Rebeca Grynspan * – United Nations Conference on Trade and Development (UNCTAD)
Tegegnework Gettu – Associate Administrator, United Nations Development Programme (UNDP)
Achim Steiner * – Administrator, United Nations Development Programme (UNDP), also chair of the United Nations Development Group
Vera Songwe * – Executive Secretary, United Nations Economic Commission for Africa (UNECA)
Olga Algayerova * – United Nations Economic Commission for Europe (UNECE)
José Manuel Salazar-Xirinachs * – United Nations Economic Commission for Latin America and the Caribbean (UNECLAC)
Rola Dashti * – United Nations Economic and Social Commission for Western Asia (UNESCWA)
Armida Alisjahbana * – United Nations Economic and Social Commission for Asia and the Pacific (UNESCAP)
Natalia Kanem * – Executive Director, United Nations Population Fund (UNFPA)
Inger Andersen * – Executive Director, United Nations Environment Programme (UNEP)
Maimunah Mohd Sharif * – Executive Director, United Nations Human Settlements Programme (UN-HABITAT)
Filippo Grandi * – United Nations High Commissioner for Refugees (UNHCR)
Catherine M. Russell * – United Nations Children's Fund (UNICEF)
Tshilidzi Marwala * – Rector, United Nations University (UNU) 
David Beasley * – Executive Director, World Food Programme (WFP)

Secretariat officials
Earle Courtenay Rattray  – High Representative for LDCs, LLDCs and SIDS
Pramila Patten * – Under-Secretary-General and Special Representative of the Secretary-General on Sexual Violence in Conflict
Gilles Michaud * – Under-Secretary-General for Safety and Security
Rosemary DiCarlo * – Under-Secretary-General for Political Affairs
Atul Khare – Under-Secretary-General for Department of Operational Support
Izumi Nakamitsu * – Under-Secretary-General, High Representative for Disarmament Affairs
Jean-Pierre Lacroix * – Under-Secretary-General for Peacekeeping Operations
Alison Smale* – Under-Secretary-General for Public Information
Martin Griffiths * – Under-Secretary-General for Humanitarian Affairs and Emergency Relief Coordinator
Augustine P. Mahiga* – Under-Secretary-General, Mediator-in-Residence, DPA's Mediator Debriefing and Lessons Learned Programme
Maria Luiza Ribeiro Viotti * – Under-Secretary-General, Chef de Cabinet
Heidi Mendoza * – Under-Secretary-General for Internal Oversight Services
Tatiana Valovaya * – Director-General of the United Nations Office at Geneva
Catherine Pollard * – Under-Secretary-General Department of Management Strategy, Policy and Compliance
Movses Abelian * – Under-Secretary-General Department for General Assembly and Conference Management
Melissa Fleming * – Under-Secretary-General for Global Communications
Carlos Gabriel Ruiz Massieu Aguirre – Chairman of the Advisory Committee on Administrative and Budgetary Questions
Miguel de Serpa Soares * – Under-Secretary-General and Legal Counsel
Liu Zhenmin * – Under-Secretary-General for Economic and Social Affairs
Leila Zerrougui – Special Representative for Children and Armed Conflict
Zainab Hawa Bangura – Director-General of the United Nations Office at Nairobi

Advisers
Bience Gawanas* – Under-Secretary-General, Special Adviser on Africa
Adama Dieng* – Under-Secretary-General Special Adviser to the Secretary-General on the Prevention of Genocide
Philippe Douste-Blazy – Special Adviser to the Secretary-General on Innovative Financing for Development
Paul Farmer* – Special Adviser to the Secretary-General for community-based medicine and lessons from Haiti
Kim Won-soo – Under-Secretary-General, Special Adviser to the Secretary-General
Nicolas Michel* – Special Adviser to the Secretary-General and Mediator in the border dispute between Equatorial Guinea and Gabon
George William Okoth-Obbo – Special Adviser to the Secretary-General on the Responsibility to Protect (since 2021)
Joseph Verner Reed, Jr. – Special Adviser to the Secretary-General
Iqbal Riza* – Under-Secretary-General, Special Adviser to the Secretary-General
Jeffrey Sachs – Senior Adviser to the Secretary-General on the Millennium Development Goals (2004–2006), Director of the United Nations Millennium Project
Espen Barth Eide* Special Adviser to the Secretary-General on Cyprus (2014–2017)
Vijay Nambiar * – Special Adviser to the Secretary-General (2012–2016)
Wilfried Lemke – Special Adviser to the Secretary-General on Sport for Development and Peace (2008–2016)

Special envoys
Gordon Brown* - Special Envoy for Global Education
Ray Chambers* - Special Envoy for Malaria
Michel Kazatchkine* - Special Envoy for HIV/AIDS in Eastern Europe and Central Asia
Nicholas Haysom* - Under-Secretary-General, Special Envoy of the Secretary-General for Sudan and South Sudan
Hanna Tetteh* - Under-Secretary-General, Head of United Nations Office to the African Union
Matthew Nimetz* - Under-Secretary-General, Personal Envoy of the Secretary-General for the Greece-FYROM Talks
J.V. Prasada Rao* - Special Envoy for AIDS in Asia & Pacific
Mary Robinson - Special Envoy on Climate Change
Terje Rød-Larsen* - Special Envoy of the Secretary-General for the implementation of Security Council resolution 1559/2004
Jacques Rogge* - Special Envoy of the Secretary-General for Youth Refugees and Sport
Christopher Ross* - Personal Envoy of the Secretary-General for Western Sahara
Hiroute Guebre Sellassie* - Special Envoy of the Secretary-General for the Sahel
Mirko Manzoni - Under-Secretary-General, Personal Envoy of the Secretary-General for Mozambique
Noeleen Heyzer - Special Envoy of the Secretary-General for Myanmar

Other very senior UN positions

Deputy secretary-general
The deputy secretary-general is the second highest-ranking official in the UN System after the secretary-general. Amina Mohammed is the current office holder.

Assistant secretary-general
An assistant secretary-general sits beneath an under-secretary-general within the UN hierarchy. Assistant secretaries-general are often deputies within departments or programmes, reporting to their respective under-secretary-general and through him or her to the UN secretary-general.

References

External links
UN Protocol and Liaison Service – List of Senior UN Officials
Special Representatives and Envoys of the Secretary-General
List of UN Senior Management Group with biographies and photos

United Nations Secretariat
United Nations posts